Two large-scale attacks against AMISOM soldiers carried out by al-Shabaab suicide bombers in Mogadishu, Somalia occurred in 2009. In total 32 people, including 28 AMISOM soldiers, were killed and 55 people were injured.

22 February attack 
On 22 February 2009, was carried out by Al-Shabaab. against the base of the African Union Mission to Somalia in Mogadishu. The attack, carried out by one suicide bomber in a car and one on foot, left 11 Burundian soldiers dead and 15 others seriously hurt. The car bomber was a Somali contractor who had easy access to the base.

17 September attack 
On 17 September 2009, twin suicide bombings occurred at Aden Adde International Airport, the headquarters of AMISOM, in Mogadishu, killing 17 soldiers. The bombers were able to enter the base using two stolen white UN cars and struck a meeting between the AMISOM troops and the Transitional Federal Government. Brigadier General Juvenal Niyoyunguruza of Burundi, the deputy head of AMISOM, was killed in the blast, while the mission's Ugandan commander, General Nathan Mugisha, was wounded. Of the dead peacekeepers, 12 were Burundian and five were Ugandan. Four Somali civilians also died in the attacks, which wounded another 40 people.

Aftermath
Shelling by both al-Shabaab and AMISOM after the bombings killed 19 Somali civilians.

References

2009
2009 murders in Somalia
21st-century mass murder in Somalia
Al-Shabaab (militant group) attacks
Terrorist attacks on airports
Attacks on buildings and structures in Somalia
Explosions in 2009
2009
February 2009 crimes
2009
Islamic terrorist incidents in 2009
Mass murder in 2009
2009
September 2009 crimes
Suicide car and truck bombings in Somalia
2009
Terrorist incidents in Somalia in 2009
Somali Civil War (2009–present)
Building bombings in Somalia
Attacks on buildings and structures in Mogadishu
February 2009 events in Africa